Gosen may refer to:

Gosen, Niigata, Japan
Gosen-Neu Zittau, Brandenburg, Germany
Gosen (Company), a Japanese manufacturer of sporting equipment
Gosen Wakashū, an ancient Japanese poetry anthology
Land of Goshen, an area in Biblical Egypt

See also
Gösen, Thuringia, Germany